Gherghel is a Romanian surname. Notable people with the surname include:

Al. Gherghel (1879–1951), Romanian poet
Ioan Gherghel (born 1978), Romanian swimmer
Petru Gherghel (born 1940), Romanian Catholic prelate

Romanian-language surnames